The Defence Engineering and Science Group (DESG) is a community of 9,000 engineers and scientists working within the United Kingdom Ministry of Defence Civil Service to equip and support the UK Armed Forces with military hardware.

Locations
Bristol
Army HQ
London
Corsham

Recruiting
There are 2 main methods of recruiting for DESG,
 The Graduate Scheme 
 Sponsorship while at University in either The DESG University Sponsorship scheme, or the Defence Technical Undergraduate Scheme (DTUS)

References

Defence science and technology agencies
Military industry in the United Kingdom
Ministry of Defence (United Kingdom)
Scientific organisations based in the United Kingdom